Eric Sjoberg (born August 22, 2001) is an American figure skater. He is the 2021 U.S. International Figure Skating Classic bronze medalist and 2020 U.S. national junior silver medalist.

Personal life
Sjoberg Graduated from the Capistrano Connections Academy in 2019.

Career

Early career 
Sjoberg began skating in 2006.

2019–2020 season 
Competing on the 2019–20 ISU Junior Grand Prix, he placed fourteenth at 2019 JGP Russia.
In January, he won the junior silver medal at the 2020 U.S. Championships. He skated a clean free skate with achieved a Level 4 on three elements. He was also assigned to the 2020 Bavarian Open, where he placed fourth.

2020–2021 season 
Sjoberg competed in the virtual Championship Series, placing first in his group and first overall. This qualified him for his first Senior national championships. Competing at the 2021 U.S. Championships, Sjoberg placed ninth.

2021-2022 season
Sjoberg started the 2021–2022 season by placing 3rd in the 2021 U.S. International Figure Skating Classic.

Programs

Competitive highlights
GP: Grand Prix; CS: Challenger Series; JGP: Junior Grand Prix

2016–17 to present

2010–2011 to 2015–2016

Detailed results

Senior level 
Small medals for short and free programs awarded only at ISU Championships. Pewter medals (fourth place) awarded only at U.S. domestic events. Current ISU world bests highlighted in bold and italic. Personal bests highlighted in bold.

Junior level 
Small medals are awarded at ISU championships only. Personal bests highlighted in bold.

Notes

References 

2001 births
Living people
American male single skaters